Respiratory protective equipment (RPE) is a form of personal protective equipment designed to protect the wearer from a variety of airborne hazards in the form of a gas, fume, mist, dust or vapour. Respirators filter the air to remove harmful particles and alongside the breathing apparatus (BA) provides clean air for the worker to breathe.

RPE is covered by a number of UK laws including:
 Personal Protective Equipment Regulations, 2002 
 Personal Protective Equipment at Work Regulations 1992
 Health and Safety at Work etc. Act 1974
 Control of Substances Hazardous to Health Regulations 2002.

The Health and Safety Executive advises that RPE should be appropriate for the needs of the wearer, the task they are undertaking and the environment in which it takes place.

See also
 Cartridges and canisters of air-purifying respirators
 Powered air-purifying respirator
 Respirator

References

Personal protective equipment